Ustynivskyi Raion was a raion (district) of Kirovohrad Oblast (province) in central Ukraine. Its administrative center was the urban-type settlement of Ustynivka. The raion was abolished on 18 July 2020 as part of the administrative reform of Ukraine, which reduced the number of raions of Kirovohrad Oblast to four. The area of Ustynivka Raion was merged into Kropyvnytskyi Raion.

At the time of disestablishment, the raion consisted of one hromada, Ustynivka settlement hromada with the administration in Ustynivka.

References

Former raions of Kirovohrad Oblast
1939 establishments in Ukraine
Ukrainian raions abolished during the 2020 administrative reform